Diogo Ganchinho (born 12 September 1987) is a Portuguese trampoline gymnast. He represented Portugal at the 2008 Summer Olympics in Beijing, China and at the 2012 Summer Olympics in London, United Kingdom.

In 2008, he finished in 11th place in the qualification round in the men's trampoline event. In 2012 he finished in 15th place in the qualification round in this event at the 2012 Summer Olympics.

In 2009, he competed in the men's synchronized trampoline at the 2009 World Games held in Kaohsiung, Taiwan.

In 2019, he represented Portugal at the 2019 European Games and he won the bronze medal in the men's trampoline event.

References

External links 
 

Living people
1987 births
Place of birth missing (living people)
Portuguese male trampolinists
Olympic gymnasts of Portugal
Gymnasts at the 2008 Summer Olympics
Gymnasts at the 2012 Summer Olympics
European Games medalists in gymnastics
Gymnasts at the 2019 European Games
European Games bronze medalists for Portugal
Competitors at the 2009 World Games
21st-century Portuguese people